The Communist League is a British political party that was formed by a group of members expelled in 1988 from Socialist Action. Those members had joined the American Socialist Workers Party's Pathfinder tendency. It maintained a bookshop in London, originally in The Cut, then Bethnal Green Road. It now operates a web/mail order service from Seven Sisters for Pathfinder publications. The League's members sell The Militant, the paper of the American Socialist Workers Party. The group claims that many of its members work in the meat-packing industry.

Electoral history 
Two Communist League candidates stood in the 2005 general election; one ran in Bethnal Green and Bow polling 38 votes, the seat which was gained by George Galloway for Respect. In the 2008 London Assembly election, Julie Crawford stood in the City and East constituency and polled 701 votes, 0.3% of the popular vote, coming 12th and last among the candidates. In the 2010 general election, the Communist League stood Caroline Bellamy in Edinburgh South West (48 votes) and Paul Davies in Hackney South and Shoreditch (110 votes). Peter Clifford stood in Manchester Central in 2012, gaining 64 votes. In the 2012 London Assembly election, Paul Davies stood in the City and East constituency and increased the vote to 1,108 (0.6) coming last out of eight candidates.

For the 2015 general elections, the Communist League stood two parliamentary candidates – in London and Manchester – and two other candidates for Manchester City Council.

Peter Clifford withdrew his candidacy in the Greater Manchester mayoral election, due to take place 4 May 2017, citing the cost of the deposit. He stood instead in the 2017 general election for the constituency of Manchester Gorton, gaining 27 votes, equating to approximately 0.1% of the vote. Andrés Mendoza also stood as a Communist League candidate in the Islington North constituency for the 2017 election, receiving 7 votes.

In the 2019 general election, Caroline Bellamy stood in the Manchester constituency of Wythenshawe & Sale East, winning 58 votes 

The Communist League announced in February 2021 that it was standing Pamela Holmes as a candidate in the 2021 London Assembly election, Peter Clifford in the 2021 Greater Manchester mayoral election and Andrés Mendoza in the 2021 London mayoral election.

Mendoza was not, however, included in the final list of mayoral candidates, suggesting the Communist League had withdrawn from the 2021 London Mayoral race. Similarly, Cifford was not included in the list of candidates declared for the Greater Manchester mayoral eection by the time nominations had closed.

See also 
 Communist League of Great Britain
 Communist League (UK, 1990)

References 

1988 establishments in the United Kingdom
Political parties established in 1988
Trotskyist organisations in the United Kingdom